Ulaşlı is a village in the Kozluk District of Batman Province in Turkey. The village is populated by Kurds of the Bekiran tribe and had a population of 1,006 in 2021.

The hamlets of Aslanlı, Camili, Hürriyet, Kale, Keklikpınar, Tomurcak and Zorluca are attached to the village.

References 

Villages in Kozluk District
Kurdish settlements in Batman Province